Born may refer to:

 Childbirth
 Born (surname), a surname (see also for a list of people with the name)
 Born (comics), a comic book limited series

Places
 Born, Belgium, a village in the German-speaking Community of Belgium
 Born, Luxembourg, a village in Luxembourg
 Born auf dem Darß, a municipality in Mecklenburg-Vorpommern, Germany
 Born, Netherlands, a town in the Netherlands
 Born, Saxony-Anhalt, a municipality in Saxony-Anhalt, Germany
 Born (crater), a small lunar impact crater located near the eastern edge of the Moon, to the northeast of the prominent crater Langrenus

Music
 Born (Bond album), 2001
 Born (Boom Crash Opera album), 1995
 Born (EP), a 2004 EP by D'espairsRay
 "Born" (song), a 1970 song by Barry Gibb
 "Born", a song by the metal band Nevermore from This Godless Endeavor
 "Born", a song by the pop-rock band OneRepublic from Oh My My
 "Born", a song by the Ohio-based band Over the Rhine from Drunkard's Prayer

Other uses
 Born rule probability density function by Max Born

See also
 Børns, American singer